The Paiania training ground is a training ground and academy base, used by the Greek football club Panathinaikos FC.

It was officially opened on June 19, 1981.   

Located in Paiania and covering 70 acres it is used since 1981 for the first team training.

Facilities  

 Hotel accommodations which consist of 27 double rooms, restaurant, bar, TV room, indoor pool, sauna, recreation hall, play rooms, storage areas and conference room. 
 Three floodlit football fields with natural grass turf.
 Three floodlit football fields with artificial turf for special preparation.
 Fully equipped gymnasium, medical facilities physiotherapy room, dressing room for the professional team and the Academy.
 Offices

References

External links

Official website

 

Panathinaikos F.C.
Paiania